The Door That Has No Key is a 1921 silent British drama film directed by Frank Hall Crane. The film is considered to be lost.

Cast 
 George Relph as Jack Scorrier
 Betty Faire as Margaret Hubbard
 Evelyn Brent as Violet Melton
 Wilfred Seagram as Pat Mulley
 Olive Sloane as Blossy Waveney
 W. Cronin Wilson as Yearsley Marrow
 Alice De Winton as Lady Emily Scorrier
 A. Harding Steerman as Honorable Claude Scorrier
 Gordon Craig as Clive

References

External links 

1921 films
1921 drama films
1921 lost films
British drama films
British silent feature films
British black-and-white films
Films directed by Frank Hall Crane
Films based on British novels
Lost British films
Lost drama films
1920s British films
Silent drama films